The Camino Real International Bridge is an international bridge which crosses the Rio Grande connecting the United States-Mexico border cities of Eagle Pass, Texas and Piedras Negras, Coahuila. The bridge is also known as "Eagle Pass-Piedras Negras International Bridge II", "Puente Dos", "Puente Camino Real" and "Puente Internacional Coahuila 2000".

Description
The American part of the Camino Real International Bridge is owned and managed by the City of Eagle Pass. The Mexican part is owned and managed by Caminos y Puentes Federales de Ingresos y Servicios Conexos (CAPUFE), the Mexican federal toll road and bridge authority. The bridge was originally constructed on September 24, 1999.

Location
The international bridge is located half-mile south of the Eagle Pass-Piedras Negras International Bridge and immediately north of the Eagle Pass Union Pacific International Railroad Bridge, the American part of which is owned by Union Pacific and the Mexican part owned by the Mexican federal government and concessioned to Ferromex.

Border crossing

The Eagle Pass Camino Real Port of Entry was built in 1999. It is the location where all commercial vehicles entering Eagle Pass are inspected.

References

International bridges in Texas
International bridges in Coahuila
Toll bridges in Texas
Bridges completed in 1999
Buildings and structures in Maverick County, Texas
Transportation in Maverick County, Texas
Road bridges in Texas
Toll bridges in Mexico